Gunsight Pass may be one of the following:

Mountain passes
Gunsight Pass (Canada) – a pass on the Continental Divide of the Americas between Alberta and British Columbia, Canada
Gunsight Pass (Denali Borough, Alaska) – a pass in Denali Borough, Alaska, United States
Gunsight Pass (North Slope Borough, Alaska) – a pass in North Slope Borough, Alaska, United States
Gunsight Pass (Arizona) – a pass in Pima County, Arizona, United States
Gunsight Pass (California) – a pass in San Bernardino County, California, United States
Gunsight Pass (Archuletta County, Colorado) – a pass in Archuleta County, Colorado, United States
Gunsight Pass (Grand County, Colorado) – a pass in Grand County, Colorado, United States
Gunsight Pass (Sawatch Range, Colorado) – a pass in Gunnison County, Colorado, United States
Gunsight Pass (Oh-be-joyful, Colorado) – a pass in Gunnison County, Colorado, United States
Gunsight Pass (Montana) – a pass on the Continental Divide of the Americas in Glacier National Park, Montana, United States
Gunsight Pass (Lane County, Oregon) – a pass in Lane County, Oregon, United States
Gunsight Pass (Malheur County, Oregon) – a pass in Malheur County, Oregon, United States
Gunsight Pass (Duchesne County, Utah) – a pass in Duchesne County, Utah, United States
Gunsight Pass (Kane County, Utah) – a pass in Kane County, Utah, United States
Gunsight Pass (Lincoln County, Wyoming) – a pass in Lincoln County, Wyoming, United States
Gunsight Pass (Bridger Lakes, Wyoming) – a pass in Sublette County, Wyoming, United States
Gunsight Pass (Union Peak, Wyoming) – a pass in Sublette County, Wyoming, United States
Gunsight Pass (Teton County, Wyoming) – a pass in Teton County, Wyoming, United States